The 2014–15 season was Villarreal Club de Fútbol's 92nd season in existence and the club's 2nd consecutive season in the top flight of Spanish football. In addition to the domestic league, Villarreal participated in this season's editions of the Copa del Rey and the UEFA Europa League. The season covered the period from 1 July 2014 to 30 June 2015.

Squad
As of June 2014..

Squad and statistics

|}

Transfers

Competitions

Overall record

La Liga

League table

Results summary

Results by round

Matches

Copa del Rey

Round of 32

Round of 16

Quarter-finals

Semi-finals

UEFA Europa League

Play-off round

Group stage

Knockout phase

Round of 32

Round of 16

References

Villarreal CF seasons
Villarreal CF
Villarreal